The Chinese Ambassador to Kuwait is the official representative of the People's Republic of China to Kuwait.

List of representatives

See also

References 

Ambassadors of China to Kuwait
Kuwait
China